Spinghar Higher Education Institute, was registered as a private higher education institute on May 20, 2009, in the city of Jalalabad, Nangarhar province, Afghanistan with ministry of higher education of Afghanistan. It has classes up to fifth year and also graduate the third bach and now they are in house job. All classes and house job doctors have been allowed to do their practical classes in Spinghar University teaching hospital and spinghar mom and hospital in jalal abad.

The Spinghar University currently holds scientific activities in three faculties (therapeutic medicine, stomatology and medical technology).

It has classes up to fifth year and also graduate the third bach  and now they are in house job. All classes and house job doctors have been allowed to do their practical classes in Spinghar University teaching hospital and spinghar momand hospital in jalal abad. Recently fourth-year student Bahauddin Baha represented Afghanistan in the World Innovation Summit for Education in Doha. Spinghar Medical Institute is trying to offer best available medical facilities to its students in Nangrahar and kabul, Afghanistan.

Jalalabad, formerly called Adinapour, as documented by the 7th century Hsuan-tsang, is a city in eastern Afghanistan.

Higher Education Institution Spin Ghar Kabul Branch has 10 Professor Dr., 71 Master and 50 Master Bachelors who are contractually and permanently collaborating with the institute.

Spinghar has thousands of students in its both branches in Curative medicines, Stomatology and medical Technology faculties.

Spinghar university has graduated three batches of Medical ( male and female ) students from the curative medicine faculty and has a good name in the country, the countrymen and the region called it a standard private university.

References

External links 
  

Universities and colleges in Afghanistan
Schools in Nangarhar Province
Educational institutions established in 2009
2009 establishments in Afghanistan
Jalalabad